Jerry Sikhosana (born 8 June 1969) is a South African former football player. Playing most of his career at Orlando Pirates, he was an assumed Pirates' fierce rival Kaizer Chiefs fan, and also performed for his team at the Soweto derbies. He was nicknamed "Legs of Thunder" after a champion racehorse that was a character on a South African TV series, and has earned legendary status at Orlando Pirates as a formidable goal poacher in the 1990s. He was part of the 1995 African Champions League winning team.

International career
He played for South Africa national soccer team and was part of the squad that travelled to France for the 1998 FIFA World Cup.

References

External links

Legends Corner: Jerry Sikhosana's double life as fan and player

1969 births
Living people
People from Tembisa
South African soccer players
South African expatriate soccer players
South Africa international soccer players
1998 FIFA World Cup players
Giant Blackpool players
Mpumalanga Black Aces F.C. players
Orlando Pirates F.C. players
AmaZulu F.C. players
Expatriate footballers in China
Yunnan Hongta players
Association football forwards
Soccer players from Gauteng